Totowa may refer to the following in the U.S. state of New Jersey:

Totowa, New Jersey, a borough in Passaic County
Totowa Borough Public Schools, a school district in the above borough
Totowa section, a neighborhood of Paterson